Streptomyces lasalocidi is a bacterium species from the genus of Streptomyces which has been isolated from soil from the Hyde Park in Massachusetts.

See also 
 List of Streptomyces species

References 

lasalocidi
Bacteria described in 2020